Fudbalski klub Famos Hrasnica is a professional association football club from the town of Hrasnica, Bosnia and Herzegovina.

The club currently plays in the Second League of the Federation of Bosnia and Herzegovina (Group Center) and plays its home matches on the Hrasnica Stadium, which has a capacity of 2,000 seats. Their neighbours from the community of Vojkovići are called Famos Vojkovići.

History
The club played in the Yugoslav Second League for many years and almost reached the first league, but lost to Croatian club Zagreb in the qualifications in the 1972–73 season. Famos also got all the way to the semi-finals of the 1975–76 Yugoslav Cup, getting eliminated by Hajduk Split 2–0 on aggregate.

After the collapse of Yugoslavia, they played primarily in Bosnia and Herzegovina's third level. Famos got relegated from the second tier, First League of FBiH, in the 2002–03 season. In the 2011–12 season, SAŠK Napredak, which had competed in the First league of the FBiH in the previous year, faced a crisis and sold their position and club to Famos who had played in the Second League of FBiH. As SAŠK couldn't just sell their position, the two clubs merged under the name Famos-SAŠK Napredak and continued to compete in First League of the FBiH in that season. In the next year, the club would again be named Famos.

Honours

Domestic

League
Yugoslav Second League:
Runners-up (1): 1972–73 
Bosnia and Herzegovina Republic League:
Winners (1): 1984–85

Cups
Yugoslav Cup:
 Semi-finalists (1): 1975–76

Club seasons
Source:

Managerial history
 Marcel Žigante (1962–1964)
 Fahrudin Zejnilović (1986–1988)
 Ratko Ninković (2000–2002)
 Dženan Hošić (9 May 2014 – 30 June 2017)
 Emir Alihodžić (13 April 2021 – present)

References

External links
Book: Memoars of FK Famos Hrasnica at Cafehrasnica.com.

 
Association football clubs established in 1953
Football clubs in Bosnia and Herzegovina
Sport in the Federation of Bosnia and Herzegovina
Famos Hrasnica
1953 establishments in Bosnia and Herzegovina